Mark Turin (born 1973) is a British anthropologist, linguist and occasional radio broadcaster who specializes in the Himalayas and the Pacific Northwest. From 2014–2018, he served as Chair of the First Nations and Endangered Languages Program and Acting Co-Director of the Institute for Critical Indigenous Studies at the University of British Columbia in Vancouver. He is an Associate Professor at the University of British Columbia, cross-appointed between the Department of Anthropology and the Institute for Critical Indigenous Studies.

Biography
After attending University College School, and completing his undergraduate studies in Anthropology and Archaeology with First Class Honours from the University of Cambridge (1995), Turin prepared a grammatical description and lexicon of the previously undocumented Thangmi (Thami) language spoken in Nepal and northern India for his doctoral research through the Himalayan Languages Project at the University of Leiden.  From May 2007 until May 2008, he served as Chief of the Translation and Interpretation Unit in the United Nations Mission in Nepal.

Turin continues to direct the Digital Himalaya Project, which he co-established in December 2000, based jointly the University of Cambridge and the University of British Columbia. In 2009, he established up the World Oral Literature Project supporting the documentation and preservation of oral literatures and endangered cultural traditions, affiliated to the University of Cambridge Museum of Archaeology and Anthropology. Turin was elected to a Fellowship at Hughes Hall, Cambridge in March 2011 and made a Quondam Fellow in March 2014.

From August 2011 to June 2014, Turin held the posts of Lecturer and Associate Research Scientist, and the founding Program Director of the Yale Himalaya Initiative at the MacMillan Center for International & Area Studies, Yale University. From 2013, together with Sienna Craig, Turin has served as Editor of Himalaya, the Journal of the Association for Nepal and Himalayan Studies. Turin's BBC Radio 4 series entitled Our Language in Your Hands aired in December 2012; and his second series On Language Location on the linguistic landscape of Bhutan and Burma/Myanmar aired in October 2014 on BBC Radio 4 and in March 2015 on the BBC World Service. Turin serves as founding editor of the World Oral Literature Series with the Cambridge-based Open Book Publishers, which aims to preserve and promote the oral literatures of Indigenous communities in innovative, responsive, ethical and culturally-appropriate ways.

Turin's work has been recognized by the Peter Wall Institute for Advanced Studies and the Killam Trust.

Positions

Current positions 

 Associate Professor, University of British Columbia, jointly appointed in the Department of Anthropology and the Institute for Critical Indigenous Studies
 Co-Lead, UBC Himalaya Program
 Associate Member, Department of Asian Studies (University of British Columbia)
 Affiliated Faculty, School of Public Policy and Global Affairs (University of British Columbia)
 Co-founder and Director of the Digital Himalaya Project
 Director of the World Oral Literature Project
 Principal investigator for the Relational Lexicography Project
 Co-Investigator on Urban growth, land-use change, and growing vulnerability in the Greater Himalaya mountain range
 Co-Investigator on First Nations Languages in the 21st Century: Looking Back, Looking Forward

Previous positions 

 2016–2018: Acting Co-Director, Institute for Critical Indigenous Studies, UBC
 2014–2018: Chair, First Nations and Endangered Languages Program, UBC
 2011–2013: Associate Research Scientist, South Asian Studies Council, Yale University
 2011–2014: Founding Program Director, Yale Himalaya Initiative
 2007–2008: Chief, Translation and Interpretation Unit, United Nations Mission in Nepal (UNMIN)

Editorial & Scholarly Boards, External Appointments 
Turin currently serves on 10 Editorial Boards, 2 Advisory Boards, 3 Advisory committees, 2 Steering Committees, and 2 Scientific Committees. He is also a member of the board of directors for the Canadian Language Museum since 2020; an Honorary committee member for the Association for the Promotion and Preservation of Himalayan Cultures (2020 – present); and was an Advisory Group Member for the Prince's Trust Canada Indigenous Languages Revitalization Initiative (2019–2020) and a Curatorial Affiliate for the Peabody Museum of Natural History (Yale, 2012 – 2020). A complete list of his appointments can be found on his faculty home page.

Research and Teaching 
Mark Turin's research, teaching and community engagement are focused on three principal areas:

Linguistics and Anthropology 
For over 20 years, Turin has worked in the Himalayan region, particularly in Nepal, northern India, and Bhutan. Most recently, he has developed research partnerships in the Pacific Northwest. In both regions, he works collaboratively with local Indigenous communities. Turin has also led research projects in the Tibetan Autonomous Region of China and in India's state of Sikkim. Turin has worked in close partnership with members of the Thangmi-speaking community (in Nepal and India) since 1996, and with members of the Heiltsuk First Nation (British Columbia, Canada) since 2015.

Policy and Practice 
Turin has been a consultant to the World Bank, the International Centre for Integrated Mountain Development, and a number of United Nations agencies.

Collaborative Research and Digital Humanities Projects 
Turin co-founded the Digital Himalaya Project in 2000, which has become an important open scholarly portal for multimedia resources on the Himalaya region. Turin briefly worked as the fieldwork coordinator for the Chintang and Puma Documentation Project (CPDP). Since 2009, Turin has directed the World Oral Literature Project, with the goal of supporting Indigenous-led research and publishing beyond the academy. He is the principal investigator for the Relational Lexicography (RelLex) project, which is developing a toolkit for dictionary-making for marginalized languages through community-informed methodologies. Turin also serves as one of project leads on a free intereactive digital map of New York City, one of the most linguistically diverse metropolitan areas in the world. In the classroom and beyond, Turin is committed to creating rich instructional experiences through the use of digital tools and open source materials.

Grants, fellowships and awards

Grants 
Turin has received grants from:

 the British Academy
 the Arts and Humanities Research Council (AHRC)
 the Social Sciences and Humanities Research Council (SSHRC)
 the National Aeronautics and Space Administration (NASA)
 the National Science Foundation (NSF)

Publications

Books

Edited volumes

 2019. The Politics of Language Contact in the Himalaya. Edited by Selma K. Sonntag and Mark Turin. Cambridge, UK: Open Book Publishers. 
2019. Book 2.0: Year of Indigenous Languages. 9 (1 & 2). Edited by Mark Turin & Mick Gowar.
2018. Memory. Edited by Philippe Tortell, Mark Turin and Margot Young. Vancouver, Canada: Peter Wall Institute and UBC Press.
2017. Searching For Sharing: Heritage and Multimedia in Africa. Edited by Daniela Merolla and Mark Turin. Cambridge, UK: Open Book Publishers. 
2014. Book 2.0: Digital Humanities. 4 (1 & 2). Edited by Mark Turin & Mick Gowar.
2014. Niko Thangmi Kham : Kaksha Nis (Our Thangmi Language : Class Two). Bir Bahadur Thami and Laxmi Basukala, edited by Mark Turin. Kathmandu: Educate the Children. Mother tongue primer for Thangmi-speaking children.
2014. Perspectives on Social Inclusion and Exclusion in Nepal, edited by Om Gurung, Mukta Singh Tamang and Mark Turin. Kathmandu: Central Department of Sociology / Anthropology, Tribhuvan University. .
 2013. After the Return: Special Issue of Museum Anthropology Review, 7 (1–2). Edited by Joshua Bell, Kimberly Christen and Mark Turin.
 2013. Oral Literature in the Digital Age: Archiving Orality and Connecting with Communities, edited by Mark Turin, Claire Wheeler and Eleanor Wilkinson. Cambridge: Oral Literature Series, Open Book Publishers. 190 pages.  & 9781909254312.
 2011. Himalayan Languages and Linguistics: Studies in Phonology, Semantics, Morphology and Syntax, edited by Mark Turin and Bettina Zeisler. Brill's Tibetan Studies Library, 5. 323 pages. Brill: Leiden.  & 900419448 7.
 2010. Language Documentation and Description, Volume 8, Special issue: Oral Literature and Language Endangerment, edited by Mark Turin and Imogen Gunn. London: Hans Rausing Endangered Languages Project, Department of Linguistics, School of Oriental and African Studies. 175 pages. .
2008. Gaiko Thangmi Kham : Kaksha Di (My Thangmi Language : Class One). Bir Bahadur Thami and Laxmi Basukala, edited by Mark Turin. Kathmandu: Educate the Children. Mother tongue primer for Thangmi-speaking children.
2004. Kesar Lall: A Homage on the Occasion of his Buraa Janko. Edited by Corneille Jest, Tej Ratna Kansakar and Mark Turin. Kathmandu: Marina Paper. .
 2003. Themes in Himalayan Languages and Linguistics . Edited by Tej Ratna Kansakar and Mark Turin. Kathmandu: South Asia Institute (SAI) Heidelberg and Tribhuvan University. .

Media 

 BBC Radio 4: On Language Location (October 2014)
 Part 1: Bhutan
 Part 2: Myanmar
 BC Radio 4: Our Language in Your Hands (December, 2012)
 Part 1: Nepal
 Part 2: South Africa
 Part 3: New York City
 50 langues autochtones sur Google Earth – Radio-Canada Colombie-Britannique
 BBC World TV interview (June 2013) Endangered Languages
 Vanishing Voices

Further reading
 "The Beckoning Silence", by Paul Bignell, The Independent on Sunday Magazine 13 December 2009, pages 10–17.
 "The Language Collector", Cambridge Alumni Magazine 59, pages 22–25.

References

External links
 Webpage at UBC
 
 Cambridge Ideas: Vanishing Voices Film

Leiden University alumni
1973 births
Academics of the University of Cambridge
Fellows of Hughes Hall, Cambridge
British anthropologists
British broadcasters
Linguists from the United Kingdom
Living people
Academic staff of the University of British Columbia